Victory for the Slain is an anti-war poem written by children's author Hugh Lofting, creator of the Doctor Dolittle series. Published in 1942, the poem is based on Lofting's experiences during World War I and one of the strongest literary expressions of his pacifism. It was Lofting's second book of verse but the only work written by him for adults.

Background and Lofting’s pacifism
Lofting was a pacifist and was often frustrated at the quickness in which governments resorted to armed conflict to resolve international issues. Lofting would often mock the reoccurring "latest war to end all wars" mentality and the martial ardor that often pervaded children's literature. While the theme of the poem is no different from those in the Doctor Dolittle series, the "meaningless and folly of war" as one commentator put it, it is presented in a manner more dark and grim than his children's literature.

That Lofting was consistent in his views is not surprising, having witnessed the horrors of war in Flanders during the First World War. In 1918 he was wounded by shrapnel from a hand grenade in the upper thigh, an injury that would plague him the rest of his life because of the doctor's inability to remove the metal fragments. Soon after his injury he left active service and moved to the United States where he wrote his popular children's series about a country physician who learned to communicate with animals. Lofting wrote his Dr. Dolittle series in order to give the animals he saw in World War I a voice they didn't have. In a larger sense, however, it was clear from the start that the Dr. Dolittle series was about the cruelty of war itself and the hope that Lofting saw from peace and cooperation.

As early as 1924, Lofting was editorializing about the negative effects of war on children. In an article written for The Nation, Lofting railed against what he called "tin-soldierism", a state of mind common at the time that glorified war and "heroic deaths". He attacked the so-called children's classics about heroes galloping across battlefields. He wrote: "That kind of battlefield has gone for good, it is still bloody, but you don't gallop. And since that kind of battlefield has gone, that kind of book—for children—should go too".

Lofting would become an internationalist as a result of his experiences stemming from World War I and advocated "Peace Preparedness" between nations. He would also, at least implicitly, become an anti-imperialist who stressed international cooperation. This spirit of cooperation is evident in his children's books. For instance, in The Voyages of Dr. Dolittle, the title character defends a smaller tribe of "Indians" from a larger tribe. Eventually Dolittle helps the two tribes forge a pact of cooperation. This is just one of many examples of his pacifist philosophy in his children's literature.

Lofting's call for peace and preparedness fell on deaf ears and the economic instability that followed World War I, resulting in the Great Depression, would manifest itself in pre-World War II Germany's political situation. Lofting fell into a state of despair at the rise of militarism on the European continent. Feeling like a modern Cassandra, Lofting began work on his seventeenth book, Dr. Dolittle and the Secret Lake. In the summer of 1941, however, he stopped work on the book to write Victory for the Slain.

Written just after the major part of Germany's bombing blitz on London, the poem's eventual publication in 1942 was met with little regard. Coming on the heels of England's near eradication, and written from the safe confines of California as his critics would say, it was not well received. That the poem was a culmination of a long-standing philosophy held by the author, rather than a reaction to the current conflict, was not understood by its readers. A commercial failure, the importance of Victory for the Slain lies in the understanding it adds to the author of the Dr. Dolittle series and the peaceful title character more than the content of the poem itself.

Structure
Victory for the Slain is divided into seven parts, with each part symbolic of the narrator's progression. It uses a traditional rhyming convention.  The word "slain" is repeated in the poem thirteen times and the thematic line, "In war the only victors are the slain", is repeated three times. It uses a mix of military and religious symbolism throughout the seven movements.

Plot and themes
The narrator is an unknown individual who journeys to, and eventually into, a cathedral. On the way, in the first two movements of the poem, he passes infantry soldiers marching and a wounded World War I veteran. The narrator also passes the poor box which is symbolic of the wealth and treasures wasted in war. In the third movement the narrator then enters a church to seek solace where he muses about the folly of war and the inability of man to learn from his past mistakes as shown in this verse:

Why must I mingle and confuse
These sounds and thoughts that muse
So madly through my mind?
Wars to end wars? —War again!
Must Mankind forever kill and kill,
Thwarting every decent dictate
Of the human will?
War again! —
When well we know
War's final victors always were the slain.

In the end, the narrator doesn't find the solace that he seeks as the chancel, the portion of the cathedral he is in during three sections of the poem, is destroyed by bombs. However, the narrator vows to learn from the lessons of the past and not give in to hatred and military revenge. It is here, perhaps, that Lofting is referencing the ongoing conflict of World War II against the Nazi regime. Thus, Lofting and the narrator, as a single person, hope that the "slain" can lead the world to an enlightened peace.

References

External links 
 "The Story of Dr. Dolittle" at Project Gutenberg

1942 poems
Pacifism in the United Kingdom